Greyston Holt (born September 30, 1985) is a Canadian actor. He is known for his role  as Ray Prager Jr in the television series Durham County, as young Emerson Hauser in the Fox series Alcatraz, and as Clayton Danvers in Space series Bitten.

Personal life
Greyston Stefancsik was born in Calgary, Alberta. He was raised by his parents, Mike and Nancy, on Salt Spring Island, British Columbia. His grandparents, Mike and Edith Stefancsik emigrated from Hungary in 1957 to Lethbridge. Greyston's maternal grandmother, Anna Horvath also immigrated from Hungary with her parents in 1927.

During his high school years, he learned to play guitar after which he formed a band and played at various venues. He also took an acting class for the "extra credits" and fell in love with a new avenue of expression.

Career
He moved to Vancouver after high school to pursue an acting career. He was cast in a small role in Killer Bash which was followed by another small role in Steven Spielberg's award winning miniseries, Into the West. After small roles in major television shows like Smallville, Blood Ties and The 4400, he was cast in a recurring role in Durham County for which he was nominated for a "Leo Award" for "Best Supporting Performance by a Male in a Dramatic Series". He was later cast in guest roles on Stargate Universe, Sanctuary, Fringe and Flashpoint.

In 2011, he was cast as the Young Emerson Hauser in the short-lived FOX series, Alcatraz. His biggest role was being cast in Space fantasy/horror TV series Bitten for which he received another "Leo Award" nomination. The success of the show led to it being acquired by American  basic cable channel, Syfy who renewed the show for a second 10-episode season.

Filmography

Film

Television

Awards and nominations

References

External links
 
 

1985 births
21st-century Canadian male actors
Canadian male film actors
Canadian male television actors
Canadian people of Hungarian descent
Living people
Male actors from British Columbia
Male actors from Calgary